Alex or Alexander Arnold may refer to:

 Alex Arnold (footballer) (born 1928), former Scottish footballer
 Alexander Arnold (actor) (born 1992), English actor
 Alexander A. Arnold (1833–1915), American politician in Wisconsin

See also
 Trent Alexander-Arnold (born 1998), English footballer